The genus Stropharia (sometimes known by the common name roundheads) is a group of medium to large agarics with a distinct membranous ring on the stipe. Well-known members of this genus include the edible Stropharia rugosoannulata and the blue-green verdigris agarics (Stropharia aeruginosa and allies). Stropharia are not generally regarded as good to eat and there are doubts over the edibility of several species. However the species Stropharia rugosoannulata is regarded as prized and delicious when young, and is now the premier mushroom for outdoor bed culture by mycophiles in temperate climates.

Taxonomy
The scientific name is derived from the Greek 'στροφος/strophos' meaning "belt", in reference to the annulus present on the stipe. Spore print color is generally medium to dark purple-brown with white edge at maturity, except for a few species that have rusty-brown spores. There is a great deal of variation, however, since this group as presently delimited is polyphyletic. Members of the core clade of Stropharia are characterized by crystalline acanthocytes among the hyphae of the mycelium and that make up the rhizoids at the base of the mushroom, and in one species, Stropharia acanthocystis, also occur in the hymenium.

Description
Recent molecular work shows the core group of the genus most closely related to Hypholoma and Pholiota. Other such as S. semiglobata are more distantly related. Stropharia had been divided into 'sections' by Rolf Singer among others, although some 'sections' were only informally named. Phylogenetically, some 'sections' have now been classified as separate genera by some authors for species lacking acanthocytes. Two examples of the reclassification of sections into genera are: Leratiomyces in 2008 in part replacing Section Stropholoma and Protostropharia in 2013 in part replacing section Stercophila.

The psychedelic mushroom formerly known as Stropharia cubensis was reclassified into the genus Psilocybe by mycologist Rolf Singer and subsequently this classification was supported by modern phylogenetic analyses based upon DNA sequence comparison. It bears a superficial resemblance to Stropharia with its relatively large size, well-developed annulus, and dark spores, hence in some references it is referred to as Psilocybe cubensis, however, it is simply a large-size example of the bluing Psilocybe and hence is not a close relative of Stropharia.

Species

Stropharia acanthocystis
Stropharia aeruginosa
Stropharia agaricoides
Stropharia agrocyboides
Stropharia albivelata
Stropharia albonitens
Stropharia albosulphurea
Stropharia ambigua
Stropharia araucariae
Stropharia aurantiaca
 Stropharia caerulea
Stropharia chrysocystidia – China
Stropharia cifuentesii – Mexico
Stropharia coronilla
Stropharia farlowiana
Stropharia formosa
Stropharia halophila
 Stropharia hornemannii
Stropharia inuncta
Stropharia kauffmanii
Stropharia lepiotiformis
Stropharia luteonitens
Stropharia mammillata
Stropharia melanosperma
Stropharia pseudocyanea
Stropharia rubrobrunnea – Western Ghats, India
 Stropharia rugosoannulata
Stropharia squamulosa
Stropharia variicolor
Stropharia venusta

Gallery

Legal status

United States

Louisiana
Except for ornamental purposes, growing, selling or possessing Stropharia spp. is prohibited by Louisiana State Act 159.

References

Strophariaceae